"Smooth Operator" is a 1984 song by Sade. Smooth operator or smoothing operator may also refer to:

 "Smooth Operator" (Big Daddy Kane song), a song by Big Daddy Kane from It's a Big Daddy Thing
 "Smooth Operator", a song by Sarah Vaughan released in 1959
 "Smooth Operator", a song by Dorothy Dandridge recorded in 1958 but not released until 1999
 A smoothing operator, used to remove noise from data
 A mathematical operator, that is a smooth function (i.e., infinitely differentiable)